The men's pole vault event was part of the track and field athletics programme at the 1924 Summer Olympics. The competition was held on Wednesday, July 9, 1924, on Thursday, July 10, 1924. Twenty pole vaulters from 13 nations competed. The maximum number of athletes per nation was 4. The event was won by Lee Barnes of the United States, the nation's seventh consecutive victory in the men's pole vault. Americans Glen Graham (silver) and James Brooker (bronze) completed the sweep, the second time (after 1904) the United States had done so—though the Americans had taken two golds and a bronze in 1908 and a gold, two silvers, and a bronze in 1912.

Background

This was the seventh appearance of the event, which is one of 12 athletics events to have been held at every Summer Olympics. The only returning finalist from the 1920 Games was silver medalist Henry Petersen of Denmark. The biggest threat to American dominance of the event was Charles Hoff of Norway, the world record holder; however, he was injured and did not compete in the pole vault. Ralph Spearow was the top American coming into the event.

Brazil, Czechoslovakia, Great Britain, and Poland each made their first appearance in the event. The United States made its seventh appearance, the only nation to have competed at every Olympic men's pole vault to that point.

Competition format

The competition continued to use the two-round format introduced in 1912, with results cleared between rounds. Vaulters received three attempts at each height.

In the qualifying round, all vaulters clearing 3.66 metres advanced to the final.

Records

These were the standing world and Olympic records (in metres) prior to the 1924 Summer Olympics.

No new world or Olympic records were set during the competition.

Schedule

Results

The current world record holder at that time [Charles Hoff] did not participate in this competition due to an injured ankle.

Qualifying

The qualification was held on Wednesday, July 9, 1924, and started at 2:00 p.m. All pole vaulters who were able to clear 3.66 metres qualified for the final. The jumping order and the jumping series are not available.

Final

The final was held on Thursday, July 10, 1924, and started at 2:30 p.m. The jumping order and the jumping series are not available.

Barnes won the gold medal in a jump-off beating Graham. Brooker won the bronze medal in a jump-off beating Petersen.

References

External links
Olympic Report
 

Men's pole vault
Pole vault at the Olympics